Frank-Michael Wahl (born 24 August 1956 in Rostock) is a former German handball player who competed in the 1980 Summer Olympics, in the 1988 Summer Olympics and in the 1992 Summer Olympics.

In 1980 he was a member of the East German handball team which won the gold medal. He played all six matches and scored 33 goals.

Eight years later he was part of the East German team which finished seventh. He played all six matches and scored 24 goals.

In 1992 he competed with the German team and finished tenth. He played five matches and scored four goals.

See also
List of handballers with 1000 or more international goals

External links
profile

1956 births
Living people
Sportspeople from Rostock
People from Bezirk Rostock
German male handball players
Handball players at the 1980 Summer Olympics
Handball players at the 1988 Summer Olympics
Handball players at the 1992 Summer Olympics
Olympic handball players of East Germany
Olympic handball players of Germany
Olympic gold medalists for East Germany
Olympic medalists in handball
Medalists at the 1980 Summer Olympics
Recipients of the Patriotic Order of Merit in gold